Notospira phalangioides is a species of beetle in the family Cicindelidae, the only species in the genus Notospira.

References

Cicindelidae
Beetles described in 1846